Chris Elliot may refer to:

 Chris Elliot (rugby league), rugby league footballer who played in the 2000s
 Chris Elliot (RAF officer) (Christina Reid Elliot), retired 2020

See also
 Christopher Elliott (disambiguation) 
 Christy Elliot (1933–2020), Scottish rugby player